The Aceh Abode Party, formerly the Aceh Regional Party, Aceh Peace Party, and the Aceh Sovereignty Party is a regional political party in Indonesia originally established to accommodate religious figures not associated with the Free Aceh Movement (GAM). It contested the 2009 elections in the province of Aceh under its original name.  Its electoral target was 20% or 3 million votes, but it only won 39,706 votes (1.85% of the Aceh vote). Under the current party name, it took part in the 2014 elections, and garnered 72,721 votes, a 3% share of the Aceh vote. This was enough for it to be awarded one seat in the 81-member Aceh People's Representative Council.

In 2016, it changed its name to Aceh Regional Party.

References

Political parties in Indonesia